Lysosomal acid phosphatase is an enzyme that in humans is encoded by the ACP2 gene.

Lysosomal acid phosphatase is composed of two subunits, alpha and beta, and is chemically and genetically distinct from red cell acid phosphatase. Lysosomal acid phosphatase 2 is a member of a family of distinct isoenzymes which hydrolyze orthophosphoric monoesters to alcohol and phosphate. Acid phosphatase deficiency is caused by mutations in the ACP2 (beta subunit) and ACP3 (alpha subunit) genes.

References

Further reading

External links
 

Human proteins